J'ai deux amours is an album by Dee Dee Bridgewater. This was Bridgewater's first album of French music; she lived in France for more than two decades and speaks French.

Reception
Dave Gelly of The Guardian stated, "'J'ai deux amours' was the number with which Josephine Baker captivated Paris in the early 1930s, and Dee Dee Bridgewater is her nearest equivalent today, a star both at home in the US and in her adopted country. Her singing is as expressive as ever, but what really caught my attention was the arrangements, a collaborative effort by the singer and her band. Harmonically sophisticated and at times fairly abstract, they quickly banish any idea of sentimental, Gallic wallow." Hrayr Attarian of All About Jazz wrote, "There's no denying that J'ai deux amours is light and fluffy and may possibly have sacrificed substance for form. But it is tasty and enjoyable, much like the cinnamon-sweet froth of a cappuccino can be, even before one gets to the strong bite of the coffee."

Jason MacNeil of AllMusic commented, "These Parisian café tunes bring out the best in this stellar jazz singer, particularly on the opening title track. Accompanied by accordion, which introduces the song, Dee Dee Bridgewater takes you from Paris down to the French Riviera with a warm, slightly island sound as she sings en français. And she has no problem creating her soothing jazz pipes regardless of language." The Buffalo News review stated, "Bridgewater still shows her skill at shaping a phrase, her ability to bring out the depths of every word. She sings in French with obvious relish. But I hope she doesn't forget her fans back home."

Track listing
"J'ai deux amours" (Géo Koger, Henri Varna, John Murray, Barry Trivers, Vincent Scotto) – 4:23
"La Mer" (Beyond the Sea) (Jack Lawrence, Charles Trenet) – 3:29
"Ne me quitte pas" (Jacques Brel, Rod McKuen) – 5:48
"Mon Homme" (My Man) (Channing Pollock, Albert Willemetz, Maurice Yvain) – 4:44
"Et Maintenant" (Pierre Delanoë, Carl Sigman, Gilbert Bécaud) – 3:26
"Que reste-t-il de nos amours ?" (Charles Trenet) – 4:57
"Dansez sur moi" (Girl Talk) (Bobby Troup, Claude Nougaro, Neal Hefti) – 4:17
"La Belle Vie" (The Good Life) (Jean Broussolle, Sacha Distel, Jack Reardon) – 10:11
"Avec le temps" (Léo Ferré) – 4:52
"La Vie en rose" (Édith Piaf, Mack David, Louiguy) – 5:19
"Les Feuilles mortes" (Jacques Prévert, Johnny Mercer, Joseph Kosma) – 4:56

Personnel
 Dee Dee Bridgewater – vocals
 Marc Berthoumieux – accordion
 Louis Winsberg – guitar
 Patrick Manougian – guitar on tracks 9 & 10
 Ira Coleman – double bass
 Minino Garay – drums, percussion

Chart positions

References

2005 albums
French-language albums
Dee Dee Bridgewater albums